John Edmund Riding  (1924–2018) was a British anaesthetist who served as the dean of the Royal College of Anaesthetists from 1976–79. He held a consultant appointment to the Royal Liverpool Hospital.

Riding was appointed a Commander of the Order of the British Empire (CBE) in the 1986 New Year Honours.

References

Deans of the Royal College of Anaesthetists
English anaesthetists
Commanders of the Order of the British Empire
1924 births
2018 deaths